The 2021–22 UConn Huskies women's basketball team represented the University of Connecticut (UConn) during the 2021–22 NCAA Division I women's basketball season. The Huskies, led by Hall of Fame head coach Geno Auriemma in his 37th season at UConn, split their home games between Harry A. Gampel Pavilion and the XL Center and were members of the Big East Conference, which they joined for women's basketball the previous season. UConn was a member of the original Big East Conference from 1979 through 2013, and one of the original women's basketball teams in that conference in 1982.

Returning from a 28–2 season with no graduations, the team went into the season highly regarded, starting the season ranked 2nd in the AP poll. The Huskies returned three seniors and sophomore consensus 2020–21 NCAA player of the year Paige Bueckers, while adding a 2nd ranked recruiting class. Several athletes transferred during the offseason and early season, leaving the team with 12 players. The no. 2 Huskies lost a November game against no. 1 South Carolina. Effects of the COVID-19 pandemic caused game postponements and cancellations. Injuries plagued the team; only two athletes played every game. In December, Bueckers suffered a knee fracture which kept her sidelined until late in the season.

With Bueckers out, UConn's offense struggled against several teams, with losses against unranked Georgia Tech and no. 6 Louisville before semester break, no. 9 Oregon in January, and unranked Big East Conference opponent Villanova in February. Coach Auriemma had the team focus on defense, keeping the Huskies in games when their offense was struggling. Nine different players started, and Auriemma tried eleven different starting lineups during the season. By the time Bueckers returned to the lineup for limited minutes, the Huskies were dominating without her. After winning the Big East regular season championship, the team won the 2022 Big East tournament and accepted an automatic bid to the 2022 NCAA Division I tournament.

As a number 2 seed in the NCAA tournament, UConn defeated 15th seed Mercer, 7th seed Central Florida, 3rd seed Indiana, and 1st seed North Carolina State to win their region and advance to their 14th consecutive Final Four. The Huskies then beat defending national champion Stanford before losing to South Carolina in the championship game. UConn finished the season with a record of 30–6.

Previous season
UConn was ranked no. 3 in both the 2020 AP and Coaches pre-season polls. During the regular season, they had a record of 21–1, including 18–0 in the Big East to win the conference regular season championship. In February 2021, they defeated no. 1 ranked South Carolina; it was UConn freshman Paige Bueckers' third straight 30-point game. UConn won the Big East tournament, winning all three of their games by over 30 points. They were ranked no. 1 in both polls at that time. As a no. 1 seed in the NCAA tournament, they won their region with a victory over no. 5 ranked Baylor in the Elite Eight. UConn then lost to Arizona in the Final Four and finished their campaign with a record of 28–2. Bueckers, the team's leading scorer, won several awards at the end of the season, including the Naismith College Player of the Year.

Offseason

Departures
The Huskies lost guards Autumn Chassion and Anna Makurat after the end of the previous season but graduated no seniors. Chassion, who had earned a place on the squad as a walk-on and played in eight games, chose to transfer to Louisiana State University at Eunice after the end of her freshman year. Makurat, who had played in 48 games in her two seasons, ended her time at UConn having averaged 6.5 points, 3.7 rebounds, and 3.0 assists per game and after entering the NCAA transfer portal, chose instead to return to her native Poland and play professional basketball with AZS AJP Gorzów Wielkopolski of the Basket Liga Kobiet. After the Huskies' first game, freshman Saylor Poffenbarger chose to transfer and then committed to play for Arkansas in late November. On December 13, sophomore forward Mir McLean announced she would be leaving the team at the end of the fall term and later transferred to Virginia.

Incoming transfers

The Huskies added forward Dorka Juhász, a graduate student transfer from Ohio State. Juhász was twice selected to the All-Big Ten team and averaged 14 points and 11 rebounds per game as a junior. Juhász had two years of eligibility remaining.

Recruiting
The Huskies had one of the best recruiting classes in the nation. They again signed the top-ranked high school player in Azzi Fudd and added rangy guard Caroline Ducharme and 6-foot-5 forward Amari DeBerry. Saylor Poffenbarger started school during the 2021 spring semester and joined the team in January, but she decided to transfer to Arkansas in November 2021.

Recruiting class of 2022

Recruiting class of 2023

Coaching
Hall of Fame head coach Geno Auriemma and Hall of Fame associate head coach Chris Dailey returned for their 37th season coaching the team; Auriemma's contract was extended for five years in May. UConn assistant coach and former player Shea Ralph left the program in April to become the head coach at Vanderbilt, leaving assistant coach Jamelle Elliott on the bench. Elliott was an UConn assistant coach from 1998 to 2009 and returned after a nine-year head coaching stint at Cincinnati. Morgan Valley, a three-time national champion as a UConn player, was hired to fill the second assistant role. Since graduation Valley had been an assistant coach with several NCAA programs, and was head coach of the Hartford Hawks when hired to coach the Huskies.

Season summary

At the season's outset, the Huskies returned several starters: seniors Christyn Williams, Olivia Nelson-Ododa, and Evina Westbrook, plus accomplished sophomore Paige Bueckers. Westbrook was eligible to enter the 2021 WNBA draft but chose to exercise her redshirt year option to play for the Huskies through her last year of eligibility. Two-time All-Big Ten forward Dorka Juhász, an Ohio State graduate transfer, was expected to add experience and depth in the post. Aubrey Griffin was the sole returning junior. Sophomores Nika Mühl, Aaliyah Edwards, Mir McLean, and Piath Gabriel returned. Highly touted freshman recruits Azzi Fudd, Amari DeBerry, Caroline Ducharme, and Saylor Poffenbarger were expected to compete for playing time.

In the season's opening weeks, Griffin was affected by a back problem and missed the entire year due to injury. Poffenbarger and McLean both announced transfers. Towards the end of the team's sixth game, Bueckers suffered a tibial plateau fracture and after surgery was forced to sit out most of the regular season, only returning before the Big East Conference tournament, where she played limited minutes. Guards Fudd and Mühl both suffered early season injuries which caused them to miss several games. Four canceled or postponed contests in December (due to pandemic or travel issues) allowed time for recovery. During the season, eight UConn players missed multiple games due to injury; with forwards Gabriel and DeBerry still in development, sometimes only six players were available for play. The only players able to compete in every regular season game were Westbrook and Edwards. Accordingly, the team tried eleven different starting lineups during the season, with nine different starters and eight different players leading a game in scoring. Caroline Ducharme assumed a scoring role originally anticipated for Fudd, but when Fudd returned both players continued to score effectively. With their scoring threats largely neutralized early in the season, the Huskies focused on defense, limiting their opponents to 54.2 points per game and collecting an average of 9.3 steals and 4.7 blocks per game. Mühl, the vocal floor leader of an aggressive and effective defense, was recognized as Big East Conference defensive player of the year. First team all-conference honors went to seniors Williams and Nelson-Ododa, with Ducharme on the second team. Both Fudd and Ducharme were named to the conference's all-freshman team. Williams won the Ann Meyers Drysdale Award as the best shooting guard in the country. UConn finished the regular season with a record of 22–5; they were 16–1 in conference play.

All the Huskies (except for Griffin) were back in playing condition by the time of the Big East Conference tournament, where they dominated all three games, including the tournament final against Villanova, the only Big East team that had defeated UConn during the regular season. In the first ever 68-team NCAA women's March Madness, UConn won games at the Storrs sub-regional against 15th seed Mercer and 7th seed Central Florida to advance to the Sweet Sixteen for a record 28th consecutive appearance. At the Bridgeport regional, the Huskies took a lead in the second quarter against 3rd seed Indiana and never looked back, advancing to a record 16th consecutive Elite Eight. In the regional finals against 1st seed North Carolina State, the teams battled through two overtimes in what game announcers called an "instant classic," and UConn won 91–87 to reach their 14th consecutive Final Four. Juhász suffered a fractured and dislocated wrist in that game and was out for the rest of the tournament. In the Final Four contest, UConn overcame defending national champion Stanford to advance to a rematch against no. 1 South Carolina in the final. In the national championship game, South Carolina jumped out to an 18-point lead while dominating the boards and held off scoring runs to defeat UConn. The Huskies finished the season with a record of 30–6 and were ranked 2nd in the final Coaches poll.

Roster

Schedule

|-
!colspan=12 style=""| Exhibition 

|-
!colspan=12 style=| Regular season

|-
!colspan=12 style=|Big East tournament

|-
!colspan=9 style="|NCAA tournament

Rankings

^ Coaches did not release a second poll at the same time as the AP.

Player statistics

See also
2021–22 UConn Huskies men's basketball team

Notes

References

UConn Huskies women's basketball seasons
NCAA Division I women's basketball tournament Final Four seasons
UConn
UConn
UConn
UConn